Long Creek Township is located in Macon County, Illinois. As of the 2010 census, its population was 10,679 and it contained 4,873 housing units.

Cities and towns 
 Long Creek
 Casner

Adjacent townships 
 Oakley Township (north)
 Cerro Gordo Township, Piatt County (northeast and east)
 Dora Township, Moultrie County (southeast)
 Mount Zion Township (south)
 South Wheatland Township (southwest and west)
 Decatur Township (west and northwest)

Geography

Demographics

References

External links
US Census
City-data.com
Illinois State Archives

Townships in Macon County, Illinois
Townships in Illinois